Kim Seok-chul (28 February 1922 – 26 July 2005) was a South Korean shaman in byeolsin-gut (별신굿, shaman ritual in the east coast of Korea) troop and hojok virtuoso (호적산조), recognized as the 82nd valuable intangible cultural asset of the Republic of Korea for his mastery of the instrument. Kim was born in 1922 at Pohang city, Kyungsangbuk-do. He was the great shaman, musician and composer of Korean traditional music.

References

External links 
[ Allmusic review]

Korean classical musicians
1922 births
2005 deaths